Tachileik (also spelt Tachilek; , ; , ; ,) is a border town in Shan State of eastern Myanmar. It is the administrative seat of Tachileik Township and Tachileik District and most populated city in eastern Shan State with 51,553 residents per 2014 census count, ahead of Kyaing Tong, but only 4th statewide. It faces Mae Sai in Thailand, and is home to one of Myanmar's seven official border trade posts with Thailand.

History
Tachileik was a border crossing used in the opium trade from the Golden Triangle, at pbase.com, archived here on 9 February 2005 by Internet Archive and was the town that the drug lord Khun Sa used to live in.

On 24 March 2011 a magnitude 6.8 earthquake struck the region very close to Tachileik. It caused some damage as far away as Chiang Mai.

On 24 March 2012 a bomb wounded 2 people at the Regina Hotel golf course in Tachileik, followed by a second bomb that exploded an hour later.

Climate

Transport
Tachileik has an airport which links to four Burmese cities – Yangon, Mandalay, Taungyi Heho and  Kengtung. By road Tachileik is connected to Kengtung, which lies 106 km (66 miles) to the north, by the Asian Highway route AH2, and via Kengtung west to Taunggyi, capital of Shan State, and east by route AH3 to Mongla and on to Yunnan Province, China.

Border crossing

Tachileik can be accessed from the Thai town of Mae Sai, which sits directly south on the other side of the small Mae Sai River. There are two bridges that provide access between Mae Sai and Tachilek, one is actively used for border crossings and the other newer one was not yet being used as of January 2007.

It may be possible for tourists to take a bicycle across the bridge, but logistically it would be difficult. It is a porous border and is actually not difficult to wade across the river. Burmese merchants used to be able to cross over and do business in Mae Sai for days at a time. The border is also a popular destination for Westerners (referred to locally as farang) who either reside in or are visiting Thailand and who need to get their passport visas renewed.

There is no charge for a 'visa run' going from Thailand to Burma on the Thai side, but there is a charge of US$10 or 500 Thai Baht on the Burmese side.

Tourism
The crowning tourist attraction is a large gold-colored stupa, which, among other things, showcases the seven days of the week. The idea is for a pilgrim to go to the spot which has the day he/she was born known as the planetary post, and do a simple spiritual worship.

West of town there are hiking trails, though currently they are designated for locals, not for tourists. There is an Akha hill tribe, over an hour's walk north-west of Tachilek called Ho Yu. There are no maps and no guides for such excursions, and Burmese authorities frown on foreign visitors leaving the beaten track.  Perhaps in the future, Tachilek authorities will lighten up on their restrictions for tourists, but for the foreseeable future: trekking, hiking, exploring, rock climbing, camping, and enjoying the river are not allowed.

Pasa Wildlife Reserve is located in the eastern side of the district.

Economy
The border trade post with Thailand opened on 16 March 1996.

In 2009, it was reported that Tachileik vendors openly sold endangered animal parts. Located immediately following the bridge that divides Myanmar and Thailand is a marketplace that sells a large variety of products, including DVDs, perfume, clothing, luggage, and wine.

Tachileik once had the reputation as a distribution nexus for heroin and ya ba (methamphetamine pills) moving from rural Myanmar to the world market. The Western media's reports said the drugs were manufactured and distributed by a number of armed groups in Myanmar.

Health care 
 Tachileik General Hospital

Notes

External links

Satellite map Maplandia
Picture

Populated places in Shan State
Myanmar–Thailand border crossings
Township capitals of Myanmar